Political cleansing of population is eliminating categories of people in specific areas for political reasons. The means may vary from forced migration to genocide.

Politicide 

Politicide is the deliberate physical destruction or elimination of a group whose members share the main characteristic of belonging to a political movement. It is a type of political repression and one of the means which is used to politically cleanse populations, with another means being forced migration. It may be compared to genocide or ethnic cleansing, both of which involve the killing of people based on their membership in a particular racial or ethnic group rather than their adherence to a particular ideology.

Politicide is used to describe the killing of groups that would not otherwise be covered by the Genocide Convention. Social scientists Ted Robert Gurr and Barbara Harff use politicide to describe the killing of groups of people who are targeted not because of their shared ethnic or communal traits but because of "their hierarchical position or political opposition to the regime and dominant groups." Harff studies genocide and politicide, sometimes shortened as geno-politicide, in order to include the killing of political, economic, ethnic and cultural groups. Manus Midlarsky uses politicide to describe an arc of large-scale killing from the western parts of the Soviet Union to China and Cambodia. In his book The Killing Trap: Genocide in the Twentieth Century, Midlarsky raises similarities between the killings of Joseph Stalin and Pol Pot.

Under the Genocide Convention, the crime of genocide generally applies to mass murder of ethnic rather than political or social groups. Protection of political groups was eliminated from the United Nations resolution after a second vote because many states, including Stalin's Soviet Union, anticipated that clause to apply unneeded limitations to their right to suppress internal disturbances. Scholarly study of genocide usually acknowledges the United Nations omission of economic and political groups, and uses mass political killing datasets of democide, and genocide and politicide, or geno-politicide. Killings by the Khmer Rouge in Democratic Kampuchea have been labeled genocide or autogenocide, and the deaths under Leninism and Stalinism in the Soviet Union, and Maoism in Communist China have been controversially investigated as possible cases; the Soviet famine of 1932–1933 and the Great Chinese Famine during the Great Leap Forward have been controversially "depicted as instances of mass killing underpinned by genocidal intent."

Typical reasons 
Some groups attempt to eliminate the base of support for political opponents such as insurgents. This happens in many countries with high levels of insurgency such as Colombia. It may be a means for and referred to as pacification.

See also 

 Anti-communist mass killings
 Classicide
 Cuban exiles
 Death squads
 Desaparecidos
 Extrajudicial killing
 Forced settlements in the Soviet Union
 Human rights violations in Pinochet's Chile
 Hundred Flowers Campaign
 Mass killings under communist regimes
 Population transfer in the Soviet Union
 White Terror (disambiguation)
 Red Terror (disambiguation)

References

Further reading 

 Harff, Barbara (2004). "Genocide Politicide". Integrated Network for Societal Conflict Research. University of Maryland, College Park.
 Mesko, Zoltan G. (2003). The Silent Conspiracy: A Communist Model of Political Cleansing at the Slovak University in Bratislava after the Second World War. .

Forced migration
Genocide
Political and cultural purges